Gladsaxe Kommune is a municipality (Danish, kommune) near Copenhagen in Region Hovedstaden on the island of Zealand (Sjælland) in eastern Denmark. Its mayor is Trine Græse, a member of the Social Democrats (Socialdemokraterne) political party.

The site of its municipal council is the town of Buddinge. Other towns in the municipality are Gladsaxe, Bagsværd, and Mørkhøj (Søborg is often mentioned wrongly, but it is just a part of Buddinge)—but town limits are not distinguishable because the towns have grown together in an urban sprawl. 
Mørkhøj, Værebro in Bagsværd and Høje-Gladsaxe are larger housing projects and home to many immigrants and being typical for many concrete highrise suburbs in Copenhagen. Picture of Gladsaxe Heights:

At Gladsaxe, there is a  guyed TV mast, which was built in 1955. It was the first TV transmission site in Denmark.

Since 2014, Gladsaxe has been home to Copenhagen gem and mineral show, the largest gem and mineral show in Scandinavia. The show is an annual two-day event that attracts exhibitors from all around the world and an audience of thousands from Denmark and Sweden.

Gladsaxe municipality was not merged with other municipalities by 1 January 2007 as the result of nationwide Kommunalreformen ("The Municipal Reform" of 2007).

Economy
Gladsaxe municipality is home to many company headquarters, including those of Novo Nordisk,  Novozymes and Scandinavian Tobacco Group and MT Højgaard.

Parks and open spaces
Park and green spaces in Gladsaxe Municipality include Aldershvile Slotspark, Bagsværd Fort Folkepark, Bagsværd Sø, Bagsværd Søpark, Gladsaxe Fort 
Gyngemosen og Høje Gladsaxe Park, Kagsåparken, Nybro Åmose, Radiomarken and Smør- og Fedtmosen.

Almost every year, if not every year, there is a day called ''Gladsaxe Day'' (Gladsaxedagen in Danish), where people in Gladsaxe come together and celebrate.

Politics

Municipal council
Gladsaxe's municipal council consists of 25 members, elected every four years.

Below are the municipal councils elected since the Municipal Reform of 2007.

Twin towns – sister cities

Gladsaxe is twinned with:

 Charlottenburg-Wilmersdorf (Berlin), Berlin, Germany
 Gagny, France
 Haabersti (Tallinn), Estonia
 Klagenfurt, Austria
 Koszalin, Poland
 Minden, Germany
 Narsaq, Kujalleq, Greenland
 Neubrandenburg, Germany
 Paisley, Scotland, United Kingdom
 Pirkkala, Finland
 Ski, Norway
 Solna, Sweden
 Split, Croatia
 Sutton, England, United Kingdom
 Taitō (Tokyo), Tokyo, Japan
 Veszprém, Hungary

Notable people

Nancy Eriksson (1907–1984), Swedish politician and a member of the Swedish Riksdag
Thomas Rørdam (born 1952), lawyer, President of the Supreme Court of Denmark
Mette Bock (born 1957), political scientist, journalist and politician
Allan Steen Kristensen (1958–1997), criminal
Thomas Bo Larsen (born 1963), actor
Lars Mikkelsen (born 1964), actor
Jonatan Spang (born 1978), standup comedian, actor and theatre director

Sport
Frederik Hansen (1885–1981), wrestler
Per Frimann (born 1962), footballer
Peter Schmeichel MBE (born 1963), footballer
Bo Spellerberg (born 1979), handballer
Chanan Colman (born 1984), Danish-Israeli basketball player 
Louise Mai Jansen (born 1984), swimmer
Daniel Wass (born 1989), footballer

References

Notes

External links 

 

Municipal statistics: NetBorger Kommunefakta, delivered from KMD aka Kommunedata (Municipal Data)
Municipal mergers and neighbors: Eniro new municipalities map
 List of parks and open spaces

 
Municipalities in the Capital Region of Denmark
Municipalities of Denmark
Copenhagen metropolitan area